Major poetry related events taking place worldwide during 2021 are outlined below under different sections. This includes poetry books released during the year in different languages, major literary awards, poetry festivals and events, besides anniversaries and deaths of renowned poets etc. Nationality words link to articles with information on the nation's poetry or literature (for instance, India or France).

Events
 January 5 – An anthology of poems by 157 blind poets from around the world titled Fountain of Light is released in a Braille version at Kolkata.

Selection of works published in English

Australia
Tony Birch, Whisper Songs
Eileen Chong, A Thousand Crimson Blooms
Erik Jensen, I Say the Sea Was Folded
Bella Li, Theory of Colours
Petra White, Cities

Canada
Rupi Kaur, Home Body

India
 Ranjit Hoskote, Hunchprose, 
 Bibhu Padhi, A Friendship with Time, 
 Antony Theodore, Psalms of Love,

Iran
Kaveh Akbar, Pilgrim Bell

New Zealand

United Kingdom

England
Raymond Antrobus, The Perseverance
Armando Iannucci, Pandemonium: Some Verses on the Current Predicament
Hannah Lowe, The Kids
Paul McCartney and Paul Muldoon, The Lyrics: 1956 to the Present
Joelle Taylor, C+nto: & Othered Poems

Northern Ireland

Scotland

Criticism, scholarship and biography in the United Kingdom

Ukraine

 Borys Kutoviy, The Deth of the Poet
 Ihor Astapenko, Trees are better than us
 Ihor Mitrov, Voice of Ukraine
 Kateryna Kalytko, Order of Silent Women
 Oleg Kotsarev, The contents of a man's pocket
 Serhiy Zhadan, Psalm of aviation

United States
Alphabetical listing by author name

Amanda Gorman, The Hill We Climb
Amanda Lovelace, Shine Your Icy Crown
Arthur Sze, Glass Constellations
Catherine Cohen, God I Feel Modern Tonight
Daniel Borzutzky, Written After a Massacre in the Year 2018
Donika Kelly, The Renunciations 
Douglas Kearney, Sho
Kate Durbin, Hoarders
Mary Oliver (died 2019), Devotions
Morgan Harper Nichols, All Along You Were Blooming
Rosebud Ben-Oni, If This Is The Age We End Discovery
Sonia Sanchez, Collected Poems
Tongo Eisen-Martin, Blood on the Fog
Tracy K. Smith, Such Color: New and Selected Poems

Anthologies in the United States
Joy Harjo, Living Nations, Living Words – contains works by Natalie Diaz, Craig Santos Perez, Sherwin Bitsui
Jan Heller Levi & Christoph Keller (eds), The Essential June Jordan
Kimiko Hahn & Harold Schechter (eds), Buzz Words: Poems About Insects

Criticism, scholarship and biography in the United States

Poets in The Best American Poetry 2019

Works published in other languages

French

German

Gujarati
Shav Vahini Ganga, poem by Parul Khakhar

Awards and honors by country
See also: List of poetry awards
Awards announced this year:

International
 Struga Poetry Evenings Golden Wreath Laureate: Carol Ann Duffy
 Struga Poetry Evenings Bridges of Struga: Vladan Krečković

Australia awards and honors
 Victorian Premier’s Prize for Poetry formerly known as C. J. Dennis Prize for Poetry :  
 Kenneth Slessor Prize for Poetry: Ellen van Neerven for Throat

Canada awards and honors
 Archibald Lampman Award: '
 J. M. Abraham Poetry Award: 
 Governor General's Awards: 
 Griffin Poetry Prize: Valzhyna Mort, ‘’Music for the Dead and Resurrected’’
 Latner Writers' Trust Poetry Prize: 
 Gerald Lampert Award: 
 Pat Lowther Award: 
 Prix Alain-Grandbois: 
 Raymond Souster Award: 
 Dorothy Livesay Poetry Prize: 
 Prix Émile-Nelligan:

France awards and honors
Prix Goncourt de la Poésie:

India awards and honors
Sahitya Akademi Award : Namita Gokhale for "Things to Leave Behind"
Jnanpith Award :- Nilamani Phookan
Moortidevi Award :- 
Saraswati Samman :- Ram Darash Mishra

New Zealand awards and honors
 Prime Minister's Awards for Literary Achievement:
 Poetry: 
 Mary and Peter Biggs Award for Poetry :

United Kingdom awards and honors
 Cholmondeley Award: Kei Miller
 Costa Book Award for poetry: Hannah Lowe, The Kids (also awarded overall Book of the Year)
 English Association's Fellows' Poetry Prizes:
 Eric Gregory Award (for a collection of poems by a poet under the age of 30):
 Forward Poetry Prize: 
 Short List: Tishani Doshi, A God at the Door; Kayo Chingonyi, A Blood Condition; Selima Hill, Men Who Feed Pigeons; Luke Kennard, Notes on the Sonnets; Stephen Sexton, Cheryl's Destinies 
Best Collection: 
Best Poem:
 Jerwood Aldeburgh First Collection Prize for poetry:
 Manchester Poetry Prize:  
 National Poet of Wales: 
 National Poetry Competition: Eric Yip for "Fricatives"
 Queen's Gold Medal for Poetry: Grace Nichols
 Seamus Heaney Poetry Prize: Sumita Chakraborty, Arrow
 T. S. Eliot Prize: Joelle Taylor, C+nto: & Othered Poems

United States awards and honors
 Arab American Book Award (The George Ellenbogen Poetry Award):
Honorable Mentions: 
 Agnes Lynch Starrett Poetry Prize:
 Anisfield-Wolf Book Award: 
 Beatrice Hawley Award from Alice James Books:
 Bollingen Prize: 
 Jackson Poetry Prize: 
 Gay Poetry: 
 Lesbian Poetry: 
 Lenore Marshall Poetry Prize: 
 Los Angeles Times Book Prize: 
 National Book Award for Poetry (NBA):
 National Book Critics Circle Award for Poetry: 
 The New Criterion Poetry Prize: 
 Pulitzer Prize for Poetry:  Natalie Diaz, Postcolonial Love Poem
 Wallace Stevens Award: 
 Whiting Awards: 
 PEN Award for Poetry in Translation: 
 PEN Center USA 2021 Poetry Award: 
 PEN/Voelcker Award for Poetry:                     
 Raiziss/de Palchi Translation Award:
 Ruth Lilly Poetry Prize: 
 Kingsley Tufts Poetry Award: 
 Walt Whitman Prize –         – Judge: 
 Yale Younger Series:

From the Poetry Society of America
 Frost Medal: 
 Shelley Memorial Award: 
 Writer Magazine/Emily Dickinson Award:
 Lyric Poetry Award:
 Alice Fay Di Castagnola Award: 
 Louise Louis/Emily F. Bourne Student Poetry Award: 
 George Bogin Memorial Award: 
 Robert H. Winner Memorial Award: 
 Cecil Hemley Memorial Award:
 Norma Farber First Book Award: 
 Lucille Medwick Memorial Award: 
 William Carlos Williams Award:

Deaths
Birth years link to the corresponding "[year] in poetry" article:
 January 2 – Neelamperoor Madhusoodanan Nair (b. 1936), Indian Malayalam-language poet
 January 17 – Shankha Ghosh (b. 1932), Indian Bengali poet, COVID-19 complications
 January 23 – Martha Madrigal (b. 1929), Mexican poet and story writer
 February 3 – James Fenton (b. 1931), Northern Irish Ulster Scots dialect poet
 February 16 – Joan Margarit (b. 1938), Catalan Spanish poet and architect
 February 22 – Lawrence Ferlinghetti (b. 1919), American poet, painter and social activist
 March 6 – N. S. Lakshminarayan Bhat (b. 1936), Indian Kannada poet and Sahitya Akademi Award winner
 March 21 – Adam Zagajewski (b. 1919), Polish poet, novelist and translator (winner of Griffin Prize and the Neustadt Prize)
 April 11 – Justo Jorge Padrón (b. 1943) Canarian Spanish poet, translator and lawyer
 April 13 – Bernard Noel (b. 1930), French poet and writer
 April 17 – Al Young (b. 1939), American poet, novelist, essayist, screenwriter and educator
 April 21 – Shankha Ghosh (b. 1932), Indian Bengali poet, winner of Padma Bhushan, Jnanpith Award and Sahitya Akdemi Award
 April 22 – Anthony Thwaite (b. 1930), English poet and editor
 May 2 – Jesús Hilario Tundidor (b. 1935), Spanish poet
 May 12 – Seamus Deane (b. 1940), Irish poet, novelist and academic
 June 7 – Moon In-soo (b. 1945), South Korean poet
 June 10 – Buddhadeb Dasgupta (b. 1944), Indian Bengali poet, lyricist and filmmaker
 June 18 – Lamia Abbas (b. 1929), Iraqi poet and Arabic literary figure
 June 22 – Giulia Niccolai (b. 1934), Italian poet, novelist and translator
 June 24 – Stephen Dunn (b. 1939), American poet, educator and Pulitzer Prize winner, of Parkinson's disease complications
 June 26 – Josip Osti (b. 1945), Slovenian poet, critic and translator
 June 27 – Kolbein Falkeid (b. 1933), Norwegian poet
 July 2 – Omar Lara (b. 1941), Chilean poet and translator
 July 7 – Michael Horovitz (b. 1935), German-born British poet, editor, visual artist and translator
 July 13 – Brother Resistance (b. 1954), Trinidadian poet and musician
 July 27 – LeRoy Clarke (b. 1938), Trinidadian visual artist, poet, lecturer and philosopher
 August 4 – Jean "Binta" Breeze (b. 1956), Jamaican dub poet
 August 9 – Aung Cheint (b. 1948), Burmese poet
 September 16 – Tim Thorne (b. 1944), Australian poet
 October 17 – Brendan Kennelly (b. 1936), Irish poet
 November 6 – Raúl Rivero (b. 1945), Cuban poet
 November 21 – Robert Bly (b. 1926), American poet and essayist

See also

 Poetry
 List of years in poetry
 List of poetry awards

References

External links

2020s in poetry
2021 poems
2020s poems
 
2021-related lists
Culture-related lists by year